Beigan Township (Foochow Romanized: Báe̤k-găng-hiŏng), is an insular rural township in Lienchiang County (the Matsu Islands), Taiwan (ROC). The township is in the East China Sea off the coast of Fujian Province, China near Fuzhou (Foochow). Beigan Island, the main island of the township, is the second largest island in the Matsu Islands. Other smaller islands in the township include Daqiu Island, known for its Formosan sika deer, and Gaodeng Island and Liang Island which are off-limits to the public. The native language many of the inhabitants is Matsu dialect which is one of the statutory languages for public transport announcements in the Matsu Islands.

Name
Beigan Township is named for Beigan Island (Peikan Island), the main island in the township. Beigan Island has also been known as Pei-kan Tang / Peikantang, Changche shan / Changqidao and Ch'ang-hsü Shan. In Song and Ming records, Beigan Island was called Xiagantang/Xiagantangshan (//) as opposed to Nangan Island (Matsu Island), which was called Shanggantang/Shanggantangshan (//).

History
Prehistoric settlement of Beigan dates back over six-thousand years before present.

Fishing villages were established on Beigan Island during the Song and Yuan dynasties.

During the Ming and Qing dynasties, the island was abandoned several times due to the Great Clearance edicts. Pirates were often seen in the area.

In 1754, a watchtower was in place on Beigan Island.

In 1869, the Qing government erected tablets in Tangqi and Qiaozi villages concerning salt taxes.

Republic of China
On August 18, 1928, during the middle of the night, the previous several days of torrential rain caused a landslide in Qiaozi resulting in the deaths of more than thirty people. One resident was rescued three days after the landslide. A family of eight was wiped out.

In 1934, a lianbao (associated bao) was created encompassing the inhabitants of the islands of Nangan, Beigan, Daqiu, Xiaoqiu, Gaodeng, Xiyang and Dongyong (Dongyin). Later, Xiyang and Dongyong (Dongyin) were divided into a separate lianbao.

On September 10, 1937, Japan occupied Beigan and Nangan.

Beigan's vast resources of fish attracted many coastal Fujian residents to settle in the area to fish. In 1949, with the establishment of the People's Republic of China in Mainland China, Matsu was separated from the mainland and was subsequently incorporated under Lienchiang County by the Government of the Republic of China.

In the early 1950s, skirmishes between Nationalist and Communist forces occurred near Gaodeng Island.

On December 12, 1950, Beigan District was established as part of the Matsu Administrative Commission (馬祖行政公署). The county government and baojia system was ended. On August 15, 1953, Lienchiang County government was reestablished including Beigan Township.

On May 31, 1955, a Chinese Communist motor torpedo boat was engaged to the northeast of Beigan Island.

On October 25, 1967, Chinese Communist shelling at Tangqi Village lead to the death of one nineteen year-old, injury of six others and the destruction of three buildings.

On May 3, 1977, and May 2 and September 28, 1980, President Chiang Ching-kuo visited the township.

In 1994, the Beigan Airport was built on Beigan Island.

On June 17, 1994, and again on August 31, 1996, President Lee Teng-hui visited the township.

On August 10, 1997, Formosa Airlines Flight 7601 crashed on Beigan Island. All of the crew and passengers died.

On November 17, 2000, President Chen Shui-bian visited the township.

In 2011, prehistoric human skeletons were found on Liang Island.

On January 19, 2013, President Ma Ying-jeou visited the township.

In 2013, the movie 100 Days was filmed in Qinbi (Cinbi) Village.

Geography

The township is located to the north of Nangan (Matsu Island) and is the second largest island in the Matsu Islands. At their closet points, Beigan Island and Nangan Island are within  of each other. The population center of Beigan is Tangqi (Tan-chi) village and is the place where major shops and restaurant are located.

Beigan is a long and narrow island with tall mountains. The terrain of the rest of the island rises and falls with large numbers of sandy beaches and outlying islands.

Minor islands include Gaodeng Island (second largest), Daqiu Island (third largest), Liang Island (fourth largest) and Xiaoqiu Island (小坵) (fifth largest). The northernmost and easternmost points of Beigan Township are on Liang Island, the westernmost point is on Jinyu, and the southernmost point is on Queshi. Other islands include Wumingdao, Qiaotou, Jinyu, Langyan / Liang Reef (Liangjiao Reef), Sanlianyu (Trio Rocks), Zhongdao, Geli Dao (Clam Island) which is now connected to southern Beigan Island by a causeway and Luoshan and Bangshan which are near the northeastern coast of Beigan Island. There is a small island just a few meters off the beach of Qinbi (Chinbi) which is about 5m high called Turtle Island.

Politics and government

Administrative divisions

Since the restoration of the county government on August 15, 1953, Beigan Township has been divided into 6 villages:
 Qinbi (Chinpi /Chinbi / Cinbi) (Foochow Romanized: Kṳ̀ng-biék-chŏng), famous for its fantastic view of Turtle Island, Daqiu Island and Gaodeng Island. Qinbi is known as 'A Mediterranean town on the Taiwan Strait'.
 Tangqi/Tangci (Tangchi), the most densely populated village on the island.
 Baisha (Paisha), near the port that the commercial boats park at.
Ciaozai / Qiaozi (Chiaozai, Chiaotzu), located on the northeastern side of Beigan.

Mayors
Since 1951, Beigan Township has had seventeen mayors:
Appointed mayors
Wang Shih-Fang Jan 1951-Dec 1953
Lin Sheng-Yen Dec 1953-Sep 1954
Lin Shou-Chi Sep 1954-Sep 1955
Cheng Tseng-Yuan Sep 1955-Sep 1956
Yang I-Cheng Sep 1956-5 Nov 1957
Yang Tso-Yung 5 Nov 1957-1 Aug 1960 
Chen Shou-Wei 1 Aug 1960-21 Feb 1962 
Yu Te-Chu 21 Feb 1962-10 Mar 1962, also mayor of Nangan
Pan Fu 10 Mar 1962-2 Jul 1962, former and later mayor of Nangan
Chen I-Peng 2 Jul 1962-19 May 1970, later mayor of Juguang and then Nangan
Li Kuei-Li 19 May 1970-1 Jan 1978, former mayor of Juguang
Elected mayors
Wang Li-Teng 1 Jan 1978-1 Mar 1982
Huang Chi-Chung 1 Mar 1982-1 Mar 1990
Wang Shih-Chien 1 Mar 1990-1 Mar 1998 
Wang Chao-Sheng 1 Mar 1998-1 Mar 2006 
Chou Jui-Ko 1 Mar 2006-24 Dec 2014 (KMT)
Chen Ju-Lan 24 Dec 2014–present (KMT), in 2014 ran against Wu Chin-Ping, ran unopposed in 2018

Economy
There are branches of 7-Eleven at the villages of Tangqi and Banli and several other shops on the island. With the withdrawal of most of the military forces, the main source of income is now tourism, with several hotels in Tangqi, and numerous B&Bs in Qinbi and Qiaozi. There are no banks on the island of Beigan, but the Chunghwa Post office has an ATM.

Education

There is one middle school and two elementary schools on Beigan Island.

The library of Beigan opens daily from Wednesday to Sundays with the exception of national holidays.

Medical Institutions
Beigang Health Bureau (衛生所)
North High Hospital (北高醫院)

Energy
The township is powered up by its Beigan Power Plant.

Tourist attractions

 Beihai Tunnel
 Benli Beach
 Tanghou Beach
 Turtle Island
 War and Peace Memorial Park Exhibition Center

Transportation

Air
The Matsu Beigan Airport links the Matsu Islands and Taiwan Island at Taipei Songshan Airport and Taichung Airport.

Sea
The township houses the Beigan Harbor. There are commercial boat rides from Nangan regularly every 10 to 15 minutes. Boats from the Port of Keelung on Taiwan Island regularly visit Nangan, and from Nangan one can take the ferry to Beigan.

Starting 23 December 2015, there will be direct ferry service between Beigan and Huangqi in Lianjiang County, Fuzhou, Fujian, Mainland China.

Road
Roads in Beigan are served by taxi or rented cars and buses. Scooters can also be rented from several places.

Gallery

See also
List of islands in the East China Sea
List of islands of Taiwan

References

External links
【MIT台灣誌 #480】馬祖列島的旅行 北竿_1080p ('Made in Taiwan Annals of Taiwan #480: Visit to the Matsu Islands Beigan 1080p')